Raphael Bove (born 5 March 1977) is an Italian Australian former professional football (soccer) player who represented Australia at international level.

Career
Bove was born in Cassino, Italy, and moved to Australia at a young age. He played his early football in Europe, appearing with teams including Dutch club SC Heerenveen and Scottish side Dundee United.

Bove was part of the Australian squad at the 1997 FIFA World Youth Championship, making two substitute appearances. He made his full international debut in November 1998, when his 90th-minute substitute appearance in the friendly match against the United States made him the 442nd player to represent Australia. Hayden Foxe, who started the match, also made his debut in the 0–0 draw in San Jose.

References

External links
 
 OzFootball profile

1977 births
Living people
People from Cassino
Australian people of Italian descent
Association football midfielders
Australian soccer players
Australian expatriate soccer players
Australia international soccer players
Italian footballers
National Soccer League (Australia) players
U.S. Livorno 1915 players
Dundee United F.C. players
Sydney Olympic FC players
SC Heerenveen players
Eredivisie players
Scottish Premier League players
Expatriate footballers in the Netherlands
Expatriate footballers in Scotland
Australian expatriate sportspeople in the Netherlands
Footballers from Lazio
Sportspeople from the Province of Frosinone